Joseph Ahearne L.R.C.P., L.R.C.S., (1852–1926) was a Surgeon-Major for the Queensland colony's defense force and later to Australian Defence Force.

Biography 
Ahearne, a native of Ireland, was admitted to L.R.C.S. (Ireland) in 1871, and L.R.C.P. (London) in 1878. He emigrated to Queensland, and went to Cooktown in 1876, where he was appointed government medical officer; in 1877, he was in Thornborough.

He was appointed Government Medical Officer at Townsville in November 1879. He joined the Volunteer Defence Force in 1881, as surgeon to the Artillery. He was appointed Surgeon-Major and Principal Medical Officer for the Northern District in Nov. 1886, and Health Officer at Townsville on 26 Nov. 1886.

In that year he visited England as the representative of the North Queensland Separation League; and much of the progress which has since attended the operations of the League is to be ascribed to the impetus given to it by Dr. Ahearne's exertions. Dr. Ahearne married Elizabeth Frances Cunningham, the daughter of Edward Cunningham, a Queensland squatter.

Ahearne served as a colonel of the medical in a contingent of the Queensland Land Force in the Boer War .

As a lieutenant colonel in April 1907, he became the medical officer for the No.5 Queensland Battalion of the Commonwealth Cadet Corps.

Ahearne Street in Townsville is named in his memory.

References 

1852 births
1926 deaths